Pseuduncifera euchlanis is a species of moth of the family Tortricidae. It is found in Mexico.

References

Moths described in 1999
Polyorthini
Moths of Central America
Taxa named by Józef Razowski